Kenneth Prager (born January 3, 1943) is an American physician. He is Professor of Medicine, Division of Pulmonary, Allergy and Critical Care Medicine, Director of Clinical Ethics and Chairman of the Medical Ethics Committee at Columbia University Medical Center.

Prager is a 1964 graduate of Columbia College and a 1968 graduate of Harvard Medical School.

He spent two years in the Indian health Service practicing general medicine on the Cheyenne River Sioux Indian Reservation in South Dakota after his medical internship. Dr. Prager held clandestine medical clinics in the Soviet Union during a visit to Refuseniks in 1986, and later set up the first U.S. - Soviet medical student exchange program between Columbia's medical school and the Moscow Medical Academy.

Prager is the brother of conservative commentator and co-founder of PragerU, Dennis Prager and the father of former Wall Street Journal reporter Joshua Prager.

Prager has occasionally written newspaper op-eds on medical ethics.

Honors and awards

 Rafael Award for Medicine, Sanz Medical Center, Netanya, Israel, 1984
 Fellow, American College of Physicians
 Award of Appreciation, New York Organ Donor Network, April 2005
 The Leonard Tow Humanism in Medicine Award, presented by the Arnold P. Gold Foundation, May 2006
 Alfred Markowitz Service Award, Society of Practitioners, Columbia Presbyterian Medical Center, June, 2006
 Ewig Clinical Education Award, Department of Medicine, Columbia University Medical Center, 2007–08
 Distinguished Alumnus Award, Society of the Alumni of New York Presbyterian/Columbia University Medical Center, November 14, 2012
 Columbia University Presidential Award for Excellence in Teaching, 2015
One of New York City's Best Internists/Pulmonologists, Castle Connoly Guide: How to Find the Best Doctors for You and Your Family, New York Metro Area, 1994, 1997, 1999-2016.

References

Living people
20th-century American Jews
Columbia University faculty
Columbia Medical School faculty
Columbia College (New York) alumni
American medical academics
Harvard Medical School alumni
1943 births
21st-century American Jews
20th-century American physicians
21st-century American physicians
20th-century American academics
21st-century American academics